Nandi Awards presented annually by Government of Andhra Pradesh. First awarded in 1964.

1968 Nandi Awards Winners List

References

1968
1968 Indian film awards